Donald Ralph Goodman (born 9 May 1966) is an English former professional footballer who played as a striker.

His professional career spanned for nearly 20 years, during which he played nearly 600 Football League games and scored 162 goals.

Career
Born in Leeds, Goodman played for Bradford City, West Bromwich Albion, Sunderland, Wolverhampton Wanderers, Sanfrecce Hiroshima, Barnsley, Motherwell, Walsall, Exeter City, Doncaster Rovers and Stafford Rangers.

He trialled with Bradford City as a teenager, whilst playing non-league football with Collingham and working as an electrician with Leeds City Council. Bradford City offered him an apprenticeship, which he turned down in favour of a non-contract deal.

He made his senior debut in May 1984, aged 17, and was still working as an electrician. He turned professional with the club that summer, but was allowed a day off every week for college.

At the age of 18, in November 1984 he scored a hat-trick for Bradford City within 7 minutes of coming on as a substitute in an FA Cup game against Tow Law Town.

On 11 May 1985, his girlfriend died in the Valley Parade fire disaster. He was playing for Bradford in that match, as the team won promotion as Third Division champions.

He was Sunderland's record signing in December 1991 when he was signed from West Bromwich Albion, the last signing of manager Denis Smith, who was sacked later that month. Goodman was cup-tied for Sunderland's run to the 1992 FA Cup Final.

Goodman joined Walsall in March 2001. At the end of that season Walsall were promoted via the play-offs and Goodman scored one of the goals in the final as they beat Reading.

As of April 2020 he was working as a football commentator for Sky Sports.

References

External links

1966 births
Living people
Footballers from Leeds
Association football forwards
English footballers
English expatriate footballers
Collingham F.C. (West Yorkshire) players
Bradford City A.F.C. players
West Bromwich Albion F.C. players
Sunderland A.F.C. players
Wolverhampton Wanderers F.C. players
Sanfrecce Hiroshima players
J1 League players
Expatriate footballers in Japan
Barnsley F.C. players
Motherwell F.C. players
Walsall F.C. players
Exeter City F.C. players
Doncaster Rovers F.C. players
Stafford Rangers F.C. players
English Football League players
Scottish Premier League players
British association football commentators
English expatriate sportspeople in Japan